Alexino is a rural locality (a village) in Semyonkovskoye Rural Settlement, Vologodsky District, Vologda Oblast, Russia. The population was 3 as of 2002.

Geography 
The distance to Vologda is 9 km, to Semyonkovo is 1 km. Pudega, Barachevo, Yarygino, Kozhevnikovo, Krasnovo, Tsypoglazovo are the nearest rural localities.

References 

Rural localities in Vologodsky District